Charles Jenkins may refer to:

Politics
 Charles A. Jenkins (born 1962), former member of the Maryland House of Delegates
 Charles E. Jenkins (died 1896), member of the Wisconsin State Assembly and the New York State Assembly
 Charles F. Jenkins (politician), member of the Georgia House of Representatives
 Charles J. Jenkins (1805–1883), American politician from Georgia
 Charles J. Jenkins (Illinois politician) (1897–1954), American lawyer and politician

Sports
 Charles Jenkins (basketball) (born 1989), American-born naturalized Serbian professional basketball player
 Charles Jenkins Jr. (born 1964), former American track and field athlete
 Charles O. Jenkins (1872–1952), American football coach, lawyer, and shipbuilder
 Charles Jenkins Sr. (born 1934), former American athlete
 Charlie Jenkins (Australian rules footballer) (born 1878)

Music 

Charles Jenkins (American Gospel musician) (born 1975), American Gospel musician
 Charles Jenkins (Australian musician)

Other 
 Charles Jenkins (bishop) (1951–2021), 10th bishop of the Episcopal Diocese of Louisiana
 Charles F. Jenkins (Quaker) (1865–1951), American Quaker and historian
 Charles Francis Jenkins (1867–1934), American engineer
 Charles Robert Jenkins (1940–2017), United States Army deserter